Andrus Vaarik (born 14 May 1958) is an Estonian film, television, and theater actor and theater director. He is best known for his portrayal of Andrus Kivirähk's fictional character Ivan Orav, Raul in the film Agent Sinikael, Osvald Kallaste in the television miniseries Tuulepealne maa and his work as a stage actor at the Tallinn City Theatre. He is the father of actress Marta Vaarik.

Awards
1980: Voldemar Panso Award
1988: 
2000: Union of Estonian Actors Award
2001: Order of the White Star, 5th Class

References

External links

1958 births
Living people
Male actors from Tallinn
Estonian male film actors
Estonian male stage actors
Estonian male television actors
Estonian male radio actors
20th-century Estonian male actors
21st-century Estonian male actors
Estonian Academy of Music and Theatre alumni
Recipients of the Order of the White Star, 5th Class